Mitchell A. Wilson (July 17, 1913 in New York - February 25, 1973) was an American novelist and physicist.

Life and career

Before becoming a writer, Wilson was a research scientist (for a time as an assistant to Enrico Fermi) and instructor in physics at the university level. Science, invention, and the ethical problems of modern atomic science are the subjects for some of his works. He also wrote non-fiction on scientific matters for the general reader.

At the height of the Cold War, he was considered a major novelist in the Soviet Union, while in his native United States his reputation was considerably less elevated.

His novels include Live with Lightning, Meeting at a Far Meridian, and My Brother, My Enemy. A 1945 novel None So Blind was adapted for the 1947 film The Woman on the Beach directed by Jean Renoir. His non-fiction includes American science and Invention, a Pictorial History and Passion to Know. At the start of his career, he collaborated on a mystery novel The Goose is Cooked with Abraham Polonsky, written under the joint pseudonym of Emmett Hogarth.

At the time of his death, Wilson was married to acting coach Stella Adler. His first marriage was to Helen Weinberg Wilson which produced two daughters: Erica Silverman, a literary agent, and Victoria Wilson, editor and publisher at Alfred A. Knopf.

Books
Energy (1963; Series: LIFE Science Library)
 The Human Body: What It Is and How It Works

References

Oxford Companion to American Literature
American National Biography

External links

20th-century American novelists
American male novelists
1913 births
1973 deaths
20th-century American male writers